Thala suduirauti is a species of sea snail, a marine gastropod mollusk, in the family Costellariidae, the ribbed miters.

References

Costellariidae